A camera is a device to make photographs or movies.

Camera may also refer to:

Arts, entertainment, and media

Films
 Camera (2000 film), a 2000 short film by David Cronenberg
 Camera (2014 film), a 2014 Singaporean film by James Leong

Music
 Camera (album), a 2010 recording by jazz guitarist Joe Morris
 "Camera" (Editors song), a song by the Editors from the 2005 album The Back Room
 "Cameras", a song by Wiz Khalifa from Rolling Papers
 "Cameras", a song by Cardiac Arrest (later Cardiacs) from The Obvious Identity, 1980
 Camera Camera, a 1992 album by Pakistani Singer Nazia and Zoheb.

Periodicals
 Camera (Japanese magazine), a former magazine
 Camera (magazine), a magazine published in Switzerland and elsewhere
 Camera (newspaper), a newspaper published in the U.S. city of Boulder, Colorado
 The Camera (American magazine)
 The Camera (Irish magazine)

Science
 Camera (cephalopod), a chamber in the shell of some cephalopods
 Community Cyberinfrastructure for Advanced Marine Microbial Ecology Research and Analysis, an online cloud computing service project

Other uses
 Committee for Accuracy in Middle East Reporting in America, a Boston-based nonprofit, pro-Israel media watchdog group
 Camera+, an app for Apple's iOS mobile operating system

See also
 Apostolic Camera, an office of the Roman Curia
 List of camera types
 Camera obscura (disambiguation)
 3D camera (disambiguation)
 In camera (disambiguation)
 Camera Café (disambiguation)
 Camera Camera (disambiguation)
 Camera, Camera, Camera, a manga series
 Campaign for Real Ale (CAMRA)
 Camara (disambiguation)
 Kamera (disambiguation)